Périgueux Cathedral is a Catholic church located in the city of Périgueux, France. The cathedral's predecessor, still in operation as a church, is dedicated to Saint Stephen (French: Cathédrale Saint-Étienne-de-la-Cité de Périgueux). 

A church was first built on the site in the 4th and 5th centuries.

In 976 the Bishop Frotaire had the Abbey of Saint-Front constructed on the site of the church.  The abbey was consecrated in 1047.  Its vaulted choir housed the tomb of Saint Front, which was sculpted in 1077 by Guimaunond, a monk of the abbey of Chaise-Dieu.  This tomb was decorated with numerous precious stones and sculptures, notably an angel with a halo made of pieces of glass and is now kept in the Périgord Museum.

The cathedral owes its name to Saint Front, the first bishop of Périgueux.  The cathedral, in either building, was and is the seat of the Bishop of Périgueux and Sarlat, as the diocese has been known since 1854.

The buildings are located in the centre of Périgueux and Saint Front Cathedral has been classed as a French Historical Monument (monument historique) since 1840.
The Saint Front Cathedral was rebuilt by architect Paul Abadie from 1852 to 1895.  Only the bell tower and the crypts, both from the 12th century, were left from the previous structures.

The cathedral is part of the World Heritage Sites of the Routes of Santiago de Compostela in France since 1998.

Architecture

The Saint Front Cathedral was designed on the model of St. Mark's Basilica in Venice.  The layout of the cathedral is in the form of a Greek cross. Its five domes with turrets show a direct architectural relationship with oriental religious buildings, which served as inspiration for the architects of Saint-Front Cathedral. The domes of Saint-Front Cathedral were once different in size, but were redesigned by architect Paul Abadie to have one size, and to be symmetrical.  The pillars carrying the load of the superstructure are 6 meters wide.  The domes are inaccessible to the public.

See also

 French Romanesque architecture
 History of medieval Arabic and Western European domes

Sources

 Catholic Hierarchy: Diocese of Périgueux-Sarlat
 

Roman Catholic cathedrals in France
Basilica churches in France
World Heritage Sites in France
Churches in Dordogne
Church buildings with domes